Ice Castles is a 1978 American romantic drama film directed by Donald Wrye and starring Lynn-Holly Johnson and Robby Benson. It is the story of Lexie Winston, a young figure skater, and her rise and fall from super stardom. Tragedy strikes when, following a freak accident, Lexie loses her sight, leaving her to hide away in the privacy of her own despair. She eventually perseveres and begins competing in figure skating again.

The work was filmed on location in Colorado and Minnesota. Its theme song "Through the Eyes of Love", performed by Melissa Manchester, was nominated for the Academy Award for Best Original Song at the 52nd Academy Awards.

A remake, also directed by Wrye, was released direct to video in 2010.

Plot summary
Alexis "Lexie" Winston is a sixteen-year-old girl from Waverly, Iowa, who dreams of becoming a champion figure skater. Her boyfriend, Nick Peterson, dreams of being a hockey player.

Coached by a family friend and former skater, Lexie enters a regional championship over her father's protests. There she is discovered by an elite coach, who sees her potential despite her lack of training and her relatively advanced age. Over her father's objections, Lexie moves from Waverly to Colorado Springs to train at the legendary Broadmoor World Arena. She becomes unpopular among her fellow trainees because of the attention lavished on her natural talent and the publicity she receives.

Lexie qualifies for the senior championship level, her life changing drastically in the process. She becomes a star, alienates her boyfriend, and begins dating a grown man, television broadcaster Brian. Becoming uncomfortable with the direction her life is taking, she leaves a sponsorship party and heads to a nearby outdoor skating rink. Her coach and the partygoers watch through the windows as she skates. She attempts a difficult triple jump but lands off the ice onto a set of tables and chairs chained together near the edge of the rink. Lexie suffers a serious head injury, a blood clot in her brain robbing her of her eyesight and leaving her able to see only light and blurry shapes. The doctor is uncertain if her injury will be permanent.

Lexie returns home and becomes a recluse. Nick, who still resents her affair with Brian, demands that she get out of the house and back onto the ice.  Despite their mutual resentment and Lexie's depression, they work through their estrangement and rediscover their love for each other. With help from Nick, her father Marcus, and original coach Beulah, Lexie begins to believe she can still fulfill her dreams.  Though virtually blind, she can still see the boards at the edge of the rink, and so learns how to compensate for her disability.

She enrolls in the sectional championship and presents a flawless program that provokes a standing ovation from the audience. Her disability, however, is revealed when she trips over roses thrown onto the ice by adoring fans. Nick rushes to her side and says, "We forgot about the flowers," as the crowd realizes that Lexie  has not recovered from her injuries but rather risen above them.

Cast and characters
 Lynn-Holly Johnson as Alexis "Lexie" Winston
 Robby Benson as Nick Peterson
 Colleen Dewhurst as Beulah Smith
 Tom Skerritt as Marcus Winston
 Jennifer Warren as Deborah Mackland
 David Huffman as Brian Dockett
 Sydney Blake as Sandy
 Craig T. McMullen as Doctor
 Kelsey Ufford as Ceciel Monchet
 Leonard Lilyholm as Hockey Coach
 Brian Foley as Choreographer
 John-Claude Bleuze as French Coach
 Theresa Willmus as Annette Brashlout
 Diana Holden as X-ray technician
 Michelle McLean as Skater
 Carol Williams as Television producer
 Kevin Heinen as Man in green jacket throwing rose

Critical response
The film holds a 44% "Rotten" rating on aggregate review site Rotten Tomatoes, based on 9 reviews, with an average score of 5.3/10.

A movie reviewer for Variety wrote, "Ice Castles combines a touching love story with the excitement and intense pressure of Olympic competition skating" and praised the performances of Dewhurst and Skerrit.

Roger Ebert disliked the sentimentality of the movie, writing:

Reviewer Austin Kennedy also gave a lukewarm review, though praised the acting as "the better part of this movie. Real life skater Lynn-Holly Johnson is charming and does a fine job as the innocent starlet."

Common Sense Media called the film a "schmaltzy classic skating movie for romantics."

Janet Maslin, in The New York Times, complained that she found the movie "amazingly hard to follow", "confusing", and "baffling"; she writes, "Wrye's bungling renders the story sob-proof."

Accolades

The film is recognized by American Film Institute in these lists:
 2002: AFI's 100 Years ... 100 Passions – Nominated
 2004: AFI's 100 Years ... 100 Songs:
 "Through the Eyes of Love" – Nominated
 2006: AFI's 100 Years ... 100 Cheers – Nominated

Remake
Director Donald Wrye remade Ice Castles in 2009. The namesake film, starring Taylor Firth and Rob Mayes, was released as a direct-to-DVD title on February 9, 2010, shortly before the 2010 Winter Olympics.

See also
 Ice Castles (soundtrack)
 List of sports films

References

External links
 

1978 films
1978 romantic drama films
American romantic drama films
Columbia Pictures films
Figure skating films
Films about Olympic figure skating
Films about the Winter Olympics
Films scored by Marvin Hamlisch
Films about blind people
Films about women's sports
Films directed by Donald Wrye
Films set in Colorado
Films set in Iowa
Films shot in Colorado
Films shot in Minnesota
Films produced by John Kemeny
1970s English-language films
1970s American films
1978 directorial debut films
English-language romantic drama films